The Gelnhausen Codex (Czech Kodex Gelnhausenův) is an early 15th-century manuscript compiled by John of  Gelnhausen, city scribe of Iglau (Jihlava). It is preserved in the city archive of Jihlava, Czech Republic. It is an important source of 14th-century Czech history.

Literature 
 Michael Simboeck: Der Codex Gelnhausen und seine Miniaturen. Iglau 1903, .
 Dietrich W. Poeck: Rituale der Ratswahl. Zeichen und Zeremoniell der Ratssetzung in Europa (12–18 Jahrhundert). (= Städteforschung. Veröffentlichungen des Instituts für vergleichende Städtegeschichte in Münster. Reihe A: Darstellungen; Bd. 60), Böhlau, Köln/Weimar/Wien 2003, .
 Zum Jubiläum des Codex Gelnhausen 1405–2005. Iglau 2005.

External links 

 Codex Gelnhausen online

15th-century illuminated manuscripts
15th century in Bohemia
Historiography of the Czech Republic
Czech manuscripts